Pietro Jerónimo Martínez y Rubio or simply Pietro Martinez y Rubio (died 22 November 1667) was a Roman Catholic prelate who served as Archbishop of Palermo (1656–1667).

Biography
On 22 September 1656, Pietro Jerónimo Martínez y Rubio was selected as Archbishop of Palermo and confirmed by Pope Alexander VII on 15 January 1657.
On 2 April 1657, he was consecrated bishop by Francesco Barberini, Cardinal-Bishop of Porto e Santa Rufina, with Francesco Gonzaga, Bishop of Cariati e Cerenzia, and Patrizio Donati, Bishop Emeritus of Minori serving as co-consecrators. 
He served as Archbishop of Palermo until his death on 22 November 1667.

While bishop, he was the principal consecrator of Francesco Arata, Bishop of Lipari (1663).

References

External links and additional sources
 (for Chronology of Bishops) 
 (for Chronology of Bishops) 

17th-century Roman Catholic bishops in Sicily
Bishops appointed by Pope Alexander VII
1667 deaths